Frank Reginald Wildman (11 June 1908 – 1994) was an English footballer who played as a goalkeeper for South Kirkby, Wolverhampton Wanderers, Reading and Swindon Town.

Playing career
Wildman began his football career at South Kirkby in the Sheffield Association League, before moving to Wolves in November 1932. Wildman secured a first team position at Wolves until the arrival of Utterson and in February 1935 he transferred to Reading. He was the second South Kirkby player within a year to join Wolves, the first being teammate and future England international Tom Smalley.

Other sport
Wildman was also a prominent member of the South Kirkby Colliery Cricket Club.

References

1908 births
1994 deaths
English footballers
Association football goalkeepers
English Football League players
South Kirkby Colliery F.C. players
Wolverhampton Wanderers F.C. players
Reading F.C. players
Swindon Town F.C. players
Frickley Athletic F.C. players